Kenneth Philip Grubb (September 14, 1895 – March 11, 1976) was a United States district judge of the United States District Court for the Eastern District of Wisconsin.

Education and career

Born in Mauston, Wisconsin, Grubb was a United States Army Lieutenant in World War I, and thereafter received a Bachelor of Laws from the University of Wisconsin Law School in 1921. He was in private practice in Milwaukee, Wisconsin from 1921 to 1955.

Federal judicial service

On May 13, 1955, Grubb was nominated by President Dwight D. Eisenhower to a new seat on the United States District Court for the Eastern District of Wisconsin created by 68 Stat. 8. He was confirmed by the United States Senate on June 15, 1955, and received his commission the next day. Grubb served in that capacity until his retirement on October 8, 1965. He died on March 11, 1976.

References

Sources
 

Judges of the United States District Court for the Eastern District of Wisconsin
United States district court judges appointed by Dwight D. Eisenhower
20th-century American judges
University of Wisconsin Law School alumni
United States Army officers
1895 births
1976 deaths
People from Mauston, Wisconsin
Military personnel from Wisconsin